Tolansky is a small, circular lunar impact crater that is located due south of the crater Parry on the Mare Cognitum. The formation is symmetric, with a light-hued outer rim and a darker interior floor. A rille belonging to the Rimae Parry almost connects with the north-northwestern rim of Tolansky.

It was named after British physicist Samuel Tolansky. It was formerly known as Parry A, prior to its current name being approved by the IAU in 1976.

References

External links
 LTO-76C1 Bonpland — L&PI topographic orthophotomap map.
 AS16-P-5423, a high-resolution image of Tolansky and terrain to the north and south

Impact craters on the Moon